The Planet Earth is the third planet from the Sun.

Planet Earth may also refer to:

Film and television 
 Planet Earth (film), a 1974 science fiction television film
 Planet Earth (1986 TV series), a PBS television documentary series about the geosciences
 Planet Earth franchise of nature documentaries produced by BBC:
 Planet Earth (2006 TV series), a BBC nature television documentary series
 Planet Earth II, a 2016 BBC nature television documentary series (sequel to Planet Earth)
 Planet Earth Live, a 2010 BBC nature documentary film

Music 
 "Planet Earth", a song by Devo on the 1980 album Freedom of Choice
 "Planet Earth" (Duran Duran song), a 1981 single by Duran Duran
 Planet Earth, a 1997 album by Mother's Army
 "Planet Earth" (Eskimo Joe song), a 2001 single by Eskimo Joe
 Planet Earth (soundtrack), the soundtrack album for the 2006 BBC nature documentary series Planet Earth
 Planet Earth (Prince album), a 2007 album by Prince and the title track of the album
 "Planet Earth", a 2009 spoken word poem by Michael Jackson included on the album This Is It

See also 
 Earth (disambiguation)